Andriy Kis (born 27 May 1982 in Lviv) is a Ukrainian luger who has competed since 2003. Competing in two Winter Olympics, he earned his best finish of 14th in the men's doubles event at Turin in 2006.

Kis's best finish at the FIL World Luge Championships in the men's double event was 14th twice (2008, 2009). His best finish at the FIL European Luge Championships was ninth in the men's doubles event at Sigulda in 2010.

References
 2006 luge men's doubles results

External links
 

1982 births
Living people
Lugers at the 2006 Winter Olympics
Lugers at the 2010 Winter Olympics
Lugers at the 2014 Winter Olympics
Olympic lugers of Ukraine
Sportspeople from Lviv
Ukrainian male lugers